The 1931 Calgary municipal election was held on November 18, 1931 to elect a Mayor and six Aldermen to sit on Calgary City Council. Along with positions on Calgary City Council, four trustees for the Public School Board, three trustees for the Separate School Board, and three questions put before the voters. Calgary City Council governed under "Initiative, Referendum and Recall" which is composed of a Mayor, Commissioner and twelve Aldermen all elected to staggered two year terms. Mayor Andrew Davison and six Aldermen: Lloyd Hamilton Fenerty, Ralph William Patterson, John Walker Russell, Wilmot Douglas Milner, Fred J. White, and Charles Edward Carr elected in 1930 continued in their positions.

Background
The election was held under the Single Transferable Voting/Proportional Representation (STV/PR) with the term for candidates being two years.

Incumbent Mayor Andrew Davison was challenged by Communist candidate Phil Luck, who was able to garner only 5.6 per cent of the popular vote. Luck expected to have greater support amongst foreign born residents, however the Calgary Herald reported a large number of resident aliens were refused the right to vote because they failed to provide naturalization papers or birth certificates.

Results

Mayor

Council
Quota for election was 2,611.

Public School Board
The quota was 3,053

Separate school board

Plebiscites

City manager
Reorganization of civic government, on whether a City Manager would be hired to take on the role of the current elected Commissioner.
For - 776
Against - 4,172

25th avenue bridge
25th Avenue Bridge for $45,000.
For - 2,845
Against - 652

Arterial highway paving
Arterial highway paving for $212,000.
For - 3,098
Against - 396

See also
List of Calgary municipal elections

References

1930s in Calgary
Municipal elections in Calgary
1931 elections in Canada